Dasun Paranavithana is a Sri Lankan international footballer who plays as a goalkeeper for Air Force in the Sri Lanka Football Premier League.

References

Sri Lankan footballers
1991 births
Living people
People from Central Province, Sri Lanka
Sri Lanka international footballers
Association football goalkeepers
Air Force SC players
Sri Lanka Football Premier League players